Baca is a Spanish surname. Notable people with the surname include:

Baca family of New Mexico
Elfego Baca (1865–1945), American gunman, lawyer and politician
Geovany Baca (born 1971), Honduran boxer
Jimmy Santiago Baca (born 1952), American poet and writer
Joe Baca (born 1947), American politician
Joe Baca Jr. (born 1969), American politician
José A. Baca (1876–1924), American politician
Lee Baca (born 1942), American sheriff
Mariano Prado Baca (1776 – 1837), Central American lawyer and politician
Polly Baca (born 1941), American politician
Rafael Baca (born 1989), Mexican footballer
Susana Baca (born 1944), Peruvian singer

See also

Bač (name)
Bača (surname)
Bacca (surname)

Spanish-language surnames